The Congress of Aachen was assembled on 24 April 1748 in the Imperial Free City of Aachen, in the west of the Holy Roman Empire, to conclude the struggle known as the War of Austrian Succession. Between 30 April and 21 May the preliminaries were agreed to between Great Britain, France and the Dutch Republic, and to these Maria Theresa, queen of Bohemia and Hungary, the kings of Sardinia and Spain, the duke of Modena, and the Republic of Genoa successively gave their adhesion. The definitive treaty was signed on 18 October, Sardinia alone refusing to accede, because the Treaty of Worms (1743) was not guaranteed.

Of the provisions of the treaty of Aix-la-Chapelle the most important were those stipulating for:
a general restitution of conquests, including Cape Breton Island to France, Madras to England and the barrier towns to the Dutch
the assignment to Don Philip of the duchies of Parma, Piacenza and Guastalla
the restoration of the duke of Modena and the republic of Genoa to their former positions
the renewal in favour of Great Britain of the Asiento contract of 16 March 1713, and of the right to send an annual vessel to the Spanish colonies
the renewal of the article of the treaty of 1718 recognizing the Protestant succession in the English throne
the recognition of the emperor Francis and the confirmation of the pragmatic sanction, i.e. of the right of Maria Theresa to the Habsburg succession
the guarantee to Prussia of the duchy of Silesia and the county of Glatz.

Spain having raised objections to the Asiento clauses, the treaty of Aix-la-Chapelle was supplemented by the Treaty of Madrid (5 October 1750), by which Great Britain surrendered her claims under those clauses in return for a sum of £100,000.

See A. J. H. de Clercq, Recueil des traites de la France; F. A. Wenk, Corpus juris gentium recentissimi, 1735–1772, vol. ii. (Leipzig, 1786), p. 337; Comte G. de Garden, Hist. des traites de paix, 1848–1887, iii. p. 373.

References

 

History of Aachen
1748 in Austria
Diplomatic conferences in Germany
18th-century diplomatic conferences
1748 in international relations
1748 conferences